Agrippine may refer to:
 Agrippine (comics)
 Agrippine (TV series)